Ada Boni (1881–1973) was an Italian chef, magazine editor, food writer and book author. Her most famous book, Il talismano della felicità (The Talisman of Happiness in English), published in 1928, is considered one of the classic Italian cookbooks and is still very popular. She also wrote the notable book, La cucina romana (Roman Cuisine in English), with the stated aim of saving traditional cuisine that was being lost.

Bibliography
Boni, Ada (1929). Il talismano della felicità. I Ed. 
Boni, Ada (1930). La cucina romana. Rome: Edizioni di Preziosa.
Boni, Ada (1969). Italian Regional Cooking. New York: Bonanza Books. 
Riolo, Claudio (2004). "Ada Boni" in Le Italiane. vol. II.

See also
Italian cuisine

References

Italian food writers
Writers from Rome
Women chefs
Italian magazine editors
1881 births
1973 deaths
Women food writers
Women cookbook writers
Women magazine editors